Wade Goodwyn is a National Desk Correspondent for National Public Radio. Goodwyn began his career in radio as a freelancer, and began working for NPR in 1991. His coverage focuses on news in and around Texas.

Early career
Goodwyn is the son of Lawrence Goodwyn, a journalist, liberal activist, and history professor at Duke University. Wade Goodwyn attended the University of Texas, graduating with a degree in history. His first career was as a political campaign staffer for Lloyd Doggett and Ralph Nader. He spent time in New York as a political organizer, and his time listening to WNYC inspired him to pursue a career in radio in general, and with NPR in particular.

Broadcasting
In 1991, Goodwyn met with All Things Considered host Robert Siegel, who connected him with the NPR hiring office. Without prior experience in radio or journalism, Goodwyn began as a freelancer, learning radio techniques from his first editor, Judith Doherty. To make his career transition financially possible, he moved back to Texas.

In 1993 he went to Waco, Texas to add to National Desk Correspondent John Burnett's coverage of the 1993 Branch Davidian siege. It became a major national story, and Goodwyn managed the first interview of a former Branch Davidian and other scoops which led to his being hired by NPR as a staff correspondent.

Goodwyn's stories are frequently included in NPR programs like All Things Considered and Morning Edition, covering Texas, the surrounding states, and other stories of national interest. Some of the noteworthy stories covered major hurricanes, the Oklahoma City bombing, the first case of ebola in the United States.

Goodwyn is known for his baritone voice, which he says deepened with age.

Personal life
Goodwyn is married with two children and works out of a home studio in Dallas, Texas.

References

NPR personalities
American radio journalists
Journalists from Texas
Year of birth missing (living people)
Living people
University of Texas alumni